Ofir is an alternate spelling of the Jewish name Ophir. The name may refer to:

Ofir Akunis (born 1973), Israeli politician
Ofir Amram (born 1986), Israeli footballer
Ofir Ben Shitrit (born 1995), Israeli singer
Ofir Davidzada (born 1991), Israeli footballer
Ofir Drori (born 1976), Israeli writer
Ofir Gendelman (born 1971), Israeli diplomat
Ofir Haim (born 1975), Israeli footballer
Ofir Haivry, Israeli political philosopher and historian
Ofir Katz (born 1980), Israeli politician
Ofir Kopel (born 1975), Israeli footballer 
Ofir Kriaf (born 1991), Israeli footballer
Ofir Lobel, (born 1976), Israeli actor and musician
Ofir Marciano (born 1989), Israeli footballer
Ofir Mizrahi (born 1993), Israeli footballer
Ofir Netzer (born 1996), Israeli gymnast
Ofir Raul Graizer (born 1981), Israeli film maker
Ofir Shwartz (born 1979), Israeli musician
Ofir Sofer (born 1975), Israeli politician

See also
Ofer (disambiguation)
Ophir (disambiguation)